The 2016–17 Wisconsin Badgers women's basketball team represented University of Wisconsin–Madison during the 2016–17 NCAA Division I women's basketball season. The Badgers, led by first-year head coach Jonathan Tsipis, played their home games at the Kohl Center and were members of the Big Ten Conference. They finished the season 9–22, 3–13 in Big Ten play to finish in a four-way for 11th place. They defeated Rutgers in the first round of the Big Ten women's tournament before losing to Michigan State.

Roster

Schedule

|-
!colspan=9 style=""| Exhibition

|-
!colspan=9 style=""| Non-conference regular season

|-
!colspan=9 style=""| Big Ten regular season

|-
!colspan=9 style="text-align: center; "|Big Ten Women's Tournament

Source

See also
 2016–17 Wisconsin Badgers men's basketball team

References

Wisconsin Badgers women's basketball seasons
Wisconsin
Wiscon
Wiscon